Eriauchenius goodmani is a species of spider in the family Archaeidae. It is endemic to Madagascar.

Taxonomy 
The holotype was collected by Steven Goodman in the Réserve Naturelle Intégrale d’Andohahela. It is named after Dr. Steven Goodman, who collected the specimens. The genus name has also been incorrectly spelt "Eriauchenius".

Habitat and distribution 
The spider is found in rainforest.

References 

Archaeidae
Spiders described in 2018